Luke John Corbett (born 10 August 1984) is an English footballer who plays as a striker. He is who plays for Hanley Swan.

Career
Born in Worcester, he started his career at Cheltenham Town, where he made one senior appearance for the Football League outfit, before embarking on a non-league career. He signed for his boyhood club Worcester City in June 2011. He cemented this position by scoring a hattrick in a 4–0 victory over rivals Redditch United in the Worcestershire Senior Cup. However, he was unable to hold down a team place, and, after a loan spell back at Leamington, joined Bedworth United on a short-term deal in March 2012. In June, he switched to Evesham United. A brief spell with Halesowen Town followed, before he returned to Evesham in March 2013; his abrupt departure from Halesowen Town, having scored eight goals in 24 appearances for the club, had left the club's manager, John Hill, baffled.

In season 2015-16 Luke was playing for Hanley Swan in the Cheltenham Football League Division 2.

References

External links

1975 births
Living people
Sportspeople from Worcester, England
English footballers
Association football forwards
Cheltenham Town F.C. players
Cirencester Town F.C. players
Hednesford Town F.C. players
Chelmsford City F.C. players
Weston-super-Mare A.F.C. players
Bath City F.C. players
Mangotsfield United F.C. players
Gloucester City A.F.C. players
Bishop's Cleeve F.C. players
Leamington F.C. players
Worcester City F.C. players
Bedworth United F.C. players
Evesham United F.C. players
Halesowen Town F.C. players
English Football League players